The Salt Waste Processing Facility (SWPF) is a  nuclear waste treatment facility for the United States Department of Energy's Nuclear Reservation Savannah River Site in Aiken, South Carolina.  It was designed, constructed and commissioned by the Parsons Corporation for treatment of nuclear salt waste and became operational in 2021.

Background
The Savannah River Site (SRS) presently contains legacy nuclear waste from the production of nuclear materials between 1951 and 2002.  The nuclear waste is stored in large (typically  nominal capacity) underground double walled storage tanks located in F-Area and H-Area tank farms.

Upon completion, the Salt Waste Processing Facility (SWPF) will be the cornerstone of the Savannah River Site (SRS) salt processing strategy. It is designed to be capable of processing  of salt solution per year.

SWPF will use specific processes that have been developed at Oak Ridge National Laboratory and Argonne National Laboratory using annular centrifugal contactors and that will be the state-of-the-art methods to target the removal of cesium-137, strontium-90, and actinides from SRS salt wastes. SWPF will remove approximately 99.998% of the cesium-137/barium-137 (metastable) activity while also removing strontium and actinides (Ref 1).

Planned Deployment of SWPF Treatment Facility
About  of salt waste are currently stored in underground waste storage tanks at SRS. This waste, along with future salt waste forecast to be sent to the tank farms, will be processed through DDA, ARP/MCU, and the SWPF. DOE estimated in
preparing the Section 3116 Determination that an additional 41.3 Mgal of unconcentrated salt waste would have been received by the Tank Farms between December 1, 2004, and the completion of salt waste processing.  After both liquid removal by processing through the Tank Farm
evaporator systems and later additions of liquid for saltcake dissolution and chemistry adjustments required for processing, approximately 84 Mgal (5.9 Mgal existing salt waste through the DDA process, 1.0 Mgal future salt waste through the DDA process, 2.1 Mgal
existing and future salt waste through ARP/MCU, 69.1 Mgal existing salt waste through SWPF, and 5.9 Mgal future salt waste through SWPF) of salt solution will be processed by Interim Salt Processing and High Capacity Salt Processing resulting in approximately 168 Mgal of grout
output from the Saltstone Production Facility to be disposed of in the Saltstone Disposal Facility. (DOE Amended Decision)

Planned Start Date Delayed
The start date for SWPF operations has been delayed to allow for modification of the SWPF preliminary design to incorporate a higher degree of performance category (PC)in the confinement barriers necessary for worker protection during natural phenomena hazard events. The Defense Nuclear Facilities Safety Board initially identified concerns related to the PC designations of the SWPF in August, 2004. DOE agreed in November,
2005, to modify the SWPF design after extensive analysis and review, resulting in an approximate two-year delay in the planned startup of SWPF. DOE anticipates that it will continue to explore possible ways to improve the schedule for design and construction of the SWPF. It remains DOE's goal to complete processing of salt waste through the
SWPF by 2019 although this date may need to be modified in the future. Despite this projected delay, DOE will not increase the quantity of waste (total curies) to be disposed of in the Saltstone Disposal Facility, nor increase the quantities (curies) processed
with interim processes or SWPF from those described here and in the Draft Section 3116 Determination for Salt Waste Disposal at the Savannah River Site and the Section 3116 Determination for Salt Waste Disposal at the Savannah River Site. Therefore, the date
change does not affect the analyses in the Section 3116 Determination for Salt Waste Disposal at the Savannah River Site, its supporting documents, or the Nuclear Regulatory Commission (NRC) consultation. The modified
schedule is reflected in the Section 3116 Determination for Salt Waste Disposal at the Savannah River. However, the technical and programmatic documents that are referenced by the Section 3116
Determination for Salt Waste Disposal at the Savannah River Site have not been updated to reflect this new date because the schedule change did not occur until after those documents were completed. (DOE Amended decision).

See also
 Nuclear fuel cycle
 MOX fuel

References

Section 3116 Determination for Salt Waste Disposal at the Savannah River Site (February 28, 2005)
Salt Waste Processing Facility Independent Technical Review (February 26, 2007)
Independent Oversight Review of the Savannah River Site Salt Waste Processing Facility Safety Basis and Design Development (August 2013)
Integrated Salt Waste Processing at the Savannah River Site, WM2015 Conference, March 15-19, 2015, Phoenix, Arizona USA (March 15, 2015)
Salt Waste Processing Facility – Phase II – Aiken, SC (July 2017)
Salt Waste Processing Facility Operations Underway (November 9, 2020)
Savannah River’s Salt Waste Processing Facility begins full operations (January 25, 2021)

External links
Official website of the Savannah River Site
Official website of Parsons Corporation
Official website of the Department of Energy
Website detailing geotechnical testing of the SWPF site.

Savannah River Site
Radioactive waste
Nuclear technology in the United States